Ali Lee Kai-sum (Chinese: 李佳芯; Jyutping: Lei5 Gaai1 Sam1; born 27 November 1982) is a Hong Kong actress and television host contracted to TVB.

Lee first received attention as a television presenter for Cable TV Hong Kong's entertainment and sports channels, having covered popular television programs such as King of Sports (體育王) and Amazing Spaces (空間大改造). In 2012, she signed an artiste contract with TVB. Lee won the Most Improved Female Artiste award at the 2016 TVB Anniversary Awards. In 2018, she won the TVB Anniversary Award for Best Actress with her role in the drama Who Wants A Baby?.

Career

After receiving an associate degree in visual arts from the City University of Hong Kong, Ali Lee briefly worked as a model for the magazine Weekend Weekly (新假期) and starred in a few television commercials. In 2008, Lee signed with Cable TV Hong Kong and began hosting numerous television programmes for the cable broadcaster, including entertainment shows, travelogues, and sports programmes. In 2011, she made her acting debut in the miniseries ICAC Investigators 2011.

Upon her contract expiration with Cable TV, Lee joined TVB in late 2012. She appeared in FIFA Confederations Cup 2013 - Kick-Off Carnival and mainly played minor supporting roles in television dramas.

Lee began to receive attention with her villainous role in the 2014 TVB anniversary drama, Overachievers. In 2015, she participated in the dramas Raising the Bar, My "Spiritual" Ex-Lover, and Rear Mirror, garnering her first nominations for Most Improved Female Artiste and Best Supporting Actress. 

In the 2016 drama Fashion War, Lee played Vincy Kei, a headstrong socialite in a power struggle with Moses Chan’s character. She took on her first female leading role in the legal drama Law dis-Order, starring opposite veterans Alex Fong and Liu Kai-chi, earning her first nominations for Best Actress and Most Popular Female Character at the 2016 TVB Anniversary Awards. Lee gained recognition as an actress by winning the Most Improved Artiste awards at both the 2016 StarHub TVB Awards and TVB Anniversary Awards. 

Lee was cast to replace Tavia Yeung, who did not renew her contract, in the 2017 drama The Provocateur. She played Never Wong, a flirtatious judge in the legal drama Legal Mavericks, for which she won My Favourite TVB Actress award at the 2017 StarHub TVB Awards. In the comedy drama My Ages Apart, Lee played Paris Sheung, an heiress and unpopular actress who wanted to find true love. She was placed among top 5 in both Best Actress and Most Popular Female Character at the 2017 TVB Anniversary Awards.

In 2018, Lee earned critical acclaim  in the family drama Who Wants A Baby?. She played Ellen Tong, a new mother who struggled to balance her responsibilities. Lee won the Best Actress award at the 2018 TVB Anniversary Awards, becoming the first TVB artiste to have won the accolade only two years after being awarded the Most Improved Female Artiste award. She also guest starred in the drama Life on the Line as the wife of Joe Ma’s character.

In 2019, Lee played cardio-thoracic surgeon Kennis Ching in the critical acclaimed medical drama Big White Duel. In July 2019, due to her politicized social media posts, Lee was supposedly dropped from several drama series, including the sequels to Legal Mavericks, Who Wants a Baby? and Big White Duel. 

In 2020, Lee made her acting comeback in the action drama Death By Zero, in which she played a single mother who became the assistant of an assassin. In July, she published a memoir titled Where The Heart Is.

In 2021, Lee played a divorced secretary in the romantic drama Beauty and the Boss, again starring opposite Moses Chan. With her role in the drama AI Romantic, she was highly praised for her portrayal as an android and became a strong contender for Best Actress. With her role as Amelia Wong in Beauty and the Boss, Lee won the Most Popular Female Character award at the 2021 TVB Anniversary Awards.  In 2022, she was one of the 12 contestant's in the second season of TVB's Variety Show: Dub of War.

Personal life
Starting from 2015, Lee dated former ViuTV artiste and stage actor Danny Chan. They ended their relationship in late 2020.

Filmography

Television dramas

Films 
  If You Care... (2002)
 I Love Hong Kong 2013 (2013)

Dubbing 

 Dub of War's Second Season Graduation Project: Spider-Man: No Way Home (2022)- Michelle Jones Watson "MJ"

Variety shows and informative programs
with Cable TV Hong Kong

《四小強繼續Look》
《體育王》
《2010有線世界盃嘉年華》
《有線1台世界盃》
《空間大改造》
《空間大改造2》
《1963》- 梳打埠的年華 
《西西里的十二夜》
《普羅旺斯的十二夜》
《日本東北的十二夜》
《60/80任你UP》
《冰島·千年一嘆》
《一屋一LOOK新部屋》
《有線製造》
《香港空間大改造》
《阿拉伯．千年一嘆》
《空間大改造3》
《四個轆．德國周圍Look》
《最佳愛情．首爾攻略》
《那些回憶．似曾相識》
《遨遊天地》
《美味關係》
《潮玩潮食》
《空間大改造4》
《去吧！台灣住囉囉》
《北京狂想曲》

with TVB

Organized Dining (J2)
《中醫神探》(J2)
So Hong Kong (Jade)
Go! Yama Girl (J2)
 Girls Go Hiking (J2)
《跑出信念》(J2)
 Sidewalk Scientist (Jade)
 Anchors with Passport (Series 2) (Jade)
 A Chef and A Gentleman (ep. 4 & 5)
 Liza's On Line (ep. 15)
 Dub of War （好聲好戲） (Jade)

Awards and nominations

TVB Anniversary Awards

TVB Star Awards Malaysia

StarHub TVB Awards

StarHub Night of Star

Yahoo Asia Buzz Awards

People's Choice Television Awards

Other nominations

References

External links 

 

1982 births
Living people
Hong Kong television actresses
21st-century Hong Kong actresses
Hong Kong television presenters